Tomás Lluisma Cabili (March 7, 1903 – March 17, 1957) was a Filipino lawyer, journalist, educator, and assemblyman from Lanao. He was also known as "Sultan Dimasangkay-ko-Ranao" for Maranaos.

Early life

He was born in Iligan, Misamis on March 7, 1903, to Guillermo Cabili and Efifania H. Lluisma.

He studied at Iligan Primary School (1911–1915) and Iligan Elementary School (1915–1918). He enrolled in four different schools to complete his secondary education from 1919 to 1923; the Zamboanga Provincial High School (1919–1920), Cebu High School (1920–1921), Silliman Institute (1921–1922), and Cebu Provincial High School (1922–1923).

He received his Bachelor of Arts degree from the University of the Philippines Cebu in 1925, then pursued a law course at the Visayan Institute, also in Cebu, from 1925 to 1927. He transferred to the Philippine College of Law, where he completed his Bachelor of Laws degree in 1929. After he graduated, he was made an instructor in the College of Law and Liberal Arts of the Visayan Institute from 1929 to 1930.

During his early years of school, he was brilliant as a student, distinguishing himself as an orator when he won the Osmeña Medal in an oratorical contest. He also won the first prize Jocson Medal in an annual debate in the Philippine Law School.

Journalism

He was a reporter of The Advertiser and later a member of the staff of Cebu's The Freeman from 1924 to 1926. He was a correspondent of the National News Service between 1930 and 1932, and again from 1933 up to his election to the First National Assembly, and as a Lanao correspondent for the DMIM Papers and The Graphic.

After he passed the bar examinations, he practiced law in his home province.

Political career

In 1934, he was appointed Justice of the Peace of the 17th Municipal District of Lanao and Acting Justice of the Peace of Dansalan, Lanao. In the same year, he became a delegate to the Constitutional Convention. He was the only delegate that did not sign the 1935 Philippine Constitution, which was ratified on February 8, 1935.

In the 1935 general elections, he was elected assemblyman for his district in the First National Assembly. He served on the committees on agriculture, codes, franchises, provincial and municipal government, the national language, public instruction, Mindanao and special provinces, appropriations, civil service, and public lands.

In 1938, he was re-elected to the Second National Assembly. He was later designated to the chairmanship of the Committee on Privileges and a member of the committees on agriculture, appropriations, forest, Mindanao and Special provinces, and national companies.

He was part of the guerrilla resistance movement during the Japanese occupation.

He had a short stint as Secretary of National Defense and Communications from February 27 to July 11, 1945, under Sergio Osmeña. He was later elected to the Senate in 1946 placing on Top 12. He was reelected in 1949 and served until 1955.

Death

He died along with President Ramon Magsaysay and 23 others on a plane crash on March 17, 1957, at Mount Manunggal in Balamban, Cebu.

Legacy

 A barangay in Iligan City was renamed from Barangay Tominobo Proper to Barangay Tomas L. Cabili on March 16, 1982.
 A Philippine Constabulary camp (now Philippine National Police office) in Barangay Tipanoy, Iligan City is named after him.

Notes

References

|-

|-

1903 births
1957 deaths
20th-century Filipino lawyers
Filipino journalists
Filipino educators
Filipino people of World War II
People from Iligan
Victims of aviation accidents or incidents in the Philippines
Majority leaders of the Senate of the Philippines
Senators of the 3rd Congress of the Philippines
Senators of the 2nd Congress of the Philippines
Senators of the 1st Congress of the Philippines
Secretaries of National Defense of the Philippines
Members of the House of Representatives of the Philippines from Lanao del Norte
Members of the House of Representatives of the Philippines from Lanao del Sur
Osmeña administration cabinet members
University of the Philippines Cebu alumni
Philippine Law School alumni
Members of the National Assembly of the Philippines
20th-century journalists